Gowd-e Talkhdan-e Zilayi (also Romanized as Gowd-e Talkhdān-e Zīlāyī) is a village in Zilayi Rural District, Margown District, Boyer-Ahmad County, Kohgiluyeh and Boyer-Ahmad Province, Iran. At the 2006 census, its population was 231, in 43 families.

References 

Populated places in Boyer-Ahmad County